Several species have been assumed to exist, but due to a lack of physical evidence they can only be regarded as potential species. They have caused confusion, as they may have been a separate species, a subspecies, an introduced species or a misidentification.

List of hypothetical species

Birds
Dominican green-and-yellow macaw
Gallus giganteus
Guadeloupe amazon
Guadeloupe parakeet
Jamaican red macaw
Lesser Antillean macaw
Martinique amazon
Martinique macaw
Hypothetical relatives of the Rodrigues parrot
Red-headed macaw
Réunion solitaire or white dodo (misidentification of the Réunion ibis)
Réunion swamphen
Painted vulture

Dinosaurs
Archaeoraptor
Proavis

Insects

Venezuelan poodle moth
Battus polydamas antiquus (possibly based on a misidentification)

Mammals
Chilihueque
Sumxu
Kting voar
Steller's sea ape
Marozi
Andean wolf
Kallana
Zhejiang unknown canid

Fish
Bathysphaera
Bathysidus
Bathyembryx

See also
Chimera (paleontology)

References

Parrots
Hypothetical extinct species